Hestur is an island in the central Faroe Islands, to the west of Streymoy and the south of Koltur. Hestur means horse in Faroese.

On the west coast is a guillemot colony. In the north there is moorland with four small lakes, of which Fagradalsvatn is the largest. At Hælur, Hestur's southernmost tip, there is a lighthouse.  The island has one settlement, a village also named Hestur on the east coast. The village enjoys the view over to Gamlarætt and Velbastaður on Streymoy. There is a ferry link to the port at Gamlarætt.

History
The island has been settled since Viking times; the old settlement was at Hælur, the southern tip of the island. Due to it being the sunward side of the island, cereal ripened better there than anywhere else on the island. But due to extreme difficulties in landing boats there, the village was abandoned and the current village of Hestur was established.

In 1919 a fishing accident resulted in the deaths of one-third of Hestur's men. In an attempt to fight the depopulation of the village, a swimming pool was built on the island in 1974. On the southern part of the island by the lake Fagradalsvatn, one can camp. Hestur's postal code is FO 280. Since 1 January 2005 the island has been part of the municipality of Tórshavn.

Important Bird Area
The coastline of the island has been identified as an Important Bird Area by BirdLife International because of its significance as a breeding site for seabirds, especially Atlantic puffins (25,000 pairs), European storm petrels (5000 pairs) and black guillemots (50 pairs).

Mountains 
The island has the following four mountains

Gallery

See also 
 List of towns in the Faroe Islands

References

External links 
 Maps of Hestur Island
 Official site of Faroe Islands
 personal website with 6 aerial photos of Hestur

Populated places in the Faroe Islands
Islands of the Faroe Islands
Important Bird Areas of the Faroe Islands